Bernadette Graf (born 25 June 1992) is an Austrian judoka. Graf represented Austria at the 2016 and 2020 Summer Olympics.

References

External links
 

1992 births
Living people
Austrian female judoka
Judoka at the 2016 Summer Olympics
Olympic judoka of Austria
Judoka at the 2015 European Games
European Games medalists in judo
European Games bronze medalists for Austria
Judoka at the 2019 European Games
Judoka at the 2020 Summer Olympics
21st-century Austrian women